Altavas, officially the Municipality of Altavas (Aklanon: Banwa it Altavas; Hiligaynon: Banwa sang Altavas), is a 4th class municipality in the province of Aklan, Philippines. According to the 2020 census, it has a population of 25,639 people.

Geography

According to the Philippine Statistics Authority, the municipality has a land area of  constituting  of the  total area of Aklan.

Climate

Barangays
Altavas is politically subdivided into 14 barangays.

Demographics

In the 2020 census, Altavas had a population of 25,639.

Aklanon is the main dialect of Altavas while Hiligaynon is also spoken and understood by the residents. Capiznon, on the other hand, is also used due to its border with Capiz.

Economy

Education

Elementary schools

 Altavas Elementary School
 Cabangila Elementary School
 Cabugao Elementary School
 Catmon Elementary School
 Dalipdip Primary School
 Dina-ut Primary School
 Eahog Primary School
 Echelon Development School
 Ginictan Elementary School
 Guisi Elementary School
 Hongoton Primary School
 Linayasan Elementary School
 Lumaynay Elementary School
 Lumaynay Elementary School (Sangay Annex)
 Lupo Elementary School
 Odiong Elementary School
 Quinasayan Primary School
 Sapa Primary School
 Talon Elementary School
 Tibiao Elementary School

Secondary schools
 Altavas National School
 Altavas National School (Lupo Extension)
 Justicia Morales - Young Memorial National High School
 Linayasan National High School

College
 Altavas College

References

External links

 [ Philippine Standard Geographic Code]

Municipalities of Aklan